Acestrorhynchus minimus is a species of fish in the family Acestrorhynchidae. It was described by Naércio Aquino de Menezes in 1969. It inhabits the Orinoco and Amazon Rivers.

References

Acestrorhynchidae
Taxa named by Naércio Aquino de Menezes
Fish described in 1969